Renan da Silva Alves (born 17 December 1992 in Rio de Janeiro), known as Renan Alves, is a Brazilian professional footballer who plays as a centre-back for Liga 1 club Barito Putera.

Career

Club
In June 2016, Renan signed for Azerbaijan Premier League side Kapaz.

In June 2017, Renan moved to Vojvodina, signing a two-year contract.

In January 2019, Renan moved to Kedah Darul Aman, signing a three-year contract.

Career statistics

Club

Honours

Club 
Kedah
 Malaysia FA Cup: 2019

References

External links
 
 Renan Alves at zerozero.pt

1992 births
Living people
Association football defenders
Footballers from Rio de Janeiro (city)
Brazilian footballers
Liga Portugal 2 players
Gil Vicente F.C. players
Azerbaijan Premier League players
Kapaz PFK players
Brazilian expatriate footballers
Brazilian expatriate sportspeople in Portugal
Expatriate footballers in Portugal
Brazilian expatriate sportspeople in Azerbaijan
Expatriate footballers in Azerbaijan
FK Vojvodina players
Serbian SuperLiga players
Brazilian expatriate sportspeople in Serbia
Expatriate footballers in Serbia
Murciélagos FC footballers
Ascenso MX players
Expatriate footballers in Mexico
Brazilian expatriate sportspeople in Indonesia
Expatriate footballers in Indonesia
Borneo F.C. players
PS Barito Putera players
Liga 1 (Indonesia) players
Brazilian expatriate sportspeople in Malaysia
Expatriate footballers in Malaysia
Kedah Darul Aman F.C. players
Malaysia Super League players